The Qingniao were blue or green birds which appear in Chinese mythology, popular stories, poetry, and religion (the Chinese are somewhat ambiguous in regard to English color vocabulary, and the word qing may and has been translated as "blue" or "green", or even "black"). Qingniao is especially regarded as the messengers or as otherwise serving the Queen Mother of the West Xi Wangmu. In some sources, three-legged Qingniao carry her messages; in other sources, a single one-legged Qingniao fetched her food.  In some versions, three, sometimes three-legged, green birds brought her food: these seem to have some similarity with the Three-footed birds believed to reside in the sun. (Sometimes these birds are called "crows".) The Qingniao are an important motif and frequently depicted in myths regarding Xi Wangmu and her Western Paradise, which is generally located on the mythical Kunlun Mountain.

See also
Birds in Chinese mythology
Chinese mythology
Distinction of blue and green in various languages
Shangyang (rainbird), a mythical one-legged bird
Three-legged crow

Notes

References
Christie, Anthony (1968). Chinese Mythology. Feltham: Hamlyn Publishing. .
Yang, Lihui, et al. (2005). Handbook of Chinese Mythology. New York: Oxford University Press. 

Mythological and legendary Chinese birds
Chinese poetry allusions